The 2007 NASCAR Craftsman Truck Series Ohio 250 was the seventh stock car race of the 2007 NASCAR Craftsman Truck Series and the fourth iteration of the event. The race was held on Saturday, May 26, 2007, before a crowd of 15,000 in Mansfield, Ohio, at Mansfield Motorsports Speedway, a  permanent oval-shaped racetrack. The race took the scheduled 250 laps to complete. At race's end, Dennis Setzer, driving for Spears Motorsports, would perform fuel mileage mastery, performing no pitstops throughout the race to win his 17th career NASCAR Craftsman Truck Series win and his only win of the season. To fill out the podium, Jack Sprague, driving for Wyler Racing, and Ken Schrader, driving for Bobby Hamilton Racing, would finish second and third, respectively.

Background 

Mansfield Motor Speedway (formerly Mansfield Motorsports Park and Mansfield Motorsports Speedway) was a 0.44 mile dirt track located in Mansfield, Ohio, United States. The track hosted an ARCA RE/MAX Series race in 2009, and it also hosted the NASCAR Camping World Truck Series from 2004 to 2008.

Entry list 

 (R) denotes rookie driver.

Practice

First practice 
The first practice session was held on Friday, May 25, at 11:30 AM EST. The session would last for one hour.

Second and final practice 
The final practice session, sometimes referred to as Happy Hour, was held on Friday, May 25, at 1:30 PM EST. The session would last for one hour.

Qualifying 
Qualifying was held on Friday, May 25, at 6:30 PM EST. Each driver would have two laps to set a fastest time; the fastest of the two would count as their official qualifying lap.

Kelly Sutton was the only driver to fail to qualify.

Full qualifying results

Race results

References 

NASCAR races at Mansfield Motorsports Park
May 2007 sports events in the United States
2007 in sports in Ohio